Sticker is the third Korean-language and fourth overall studio album by South Korean boy band NCT 127. It was released on September 17, 2021, by SM Entertainment, distributed by Dreamus in South Korea and Virgin Music in United States. It follows their Japanese-language EP Loveholic, released in February 2021, and previous Korean-language studio album Neo Zone, released in March 2020. On October 25, the group released a repackaged version of Sticker, titled Favorite, which features three new tracks, including the lead single "Favorite (Vampire)".

The album and its reissue were commercially successful both in South Korea and internationally, selling a total of 3.58 million copies. Sticker became the best-selling album of all-time by an act under SM Entertainment, the best-selling K-pop album of 2021 both globally and in the United States (in pure sales), and the best-selling album by NCT 127 and by an NCT sub-unit. Sticker debuted and peaked at number 40 on the UK Albums Chart, becoming NCT 127's first appearance on said chart. On the Billboard 200, Sticker debuted and peaked at number three; it became the longest-charting album by an SM Entertainment artist, and NCT 127 became the third K-pop group to chart for 17 weeks after BTS and Blackpink. The album received positive reviews from music critics, with several publications naming it as one of the best K-pop albums from 2021. Sticker won the Album of the Year award from the 2021 Asia Artist Awards.

Background
On June 28, 2021, SM Entertainment released a presentation on the future of the company and planned comebacks of their artists during the "SM Congress" event. The presentation indicated that NCT 127 was planning to release a third studio album and repackage before the year's end. At a fanmeet in celebration of the group's fifth anniversary, they confirmed the album would have a September release window.

Promotion
Sticker was teased with a concept trailer titled "Who Is Sticker", released on August 21, which depicted the members of NCT 127 as engineering students by day and computer hackers by night. On August 22, SM Entertainment announced the album's release date as September 17 on the group's social media accounts. On September 10, NCT 127 released a playlist called "Welcome to NCT 127 Sticker, the Enhanced Playlist" exclusively on Spotify. Sticker was officially released on September 17, and the group promoted the album and its title track on The Late Late Show with James Corden.

Commercial performance

Sticker 
On August 24, 2021, after just one day of availability, it was reported that Sticker had surpassed 1,329,000 pre-orders, eventually surpassing 2.2 million pre-orders on the day of release, exceeding their previous career high of 530,000 pre-orders for Neo Zone and setting a new record for artists under SM Entertainment.

On September 24, 2021, NCT 127 broke their own sales record to become a double-million seller, with over 2.15 million copies of Sticker sold in just one week. As of November 2021, the album has sold 2.4 million copies.

Sticker debuted at number three on the US Billboard 200, selling 58,000 copies in its first week. As of March 2022, it has sold over 230,000 copies in the United States.

Favorite 
On October 25, 2021, it was reported that Favorite surpassed 1,060,000 pre-orders, making it the most pre-ordered repackaged album from SM Entertainment. One week after its release, it was reported that the album has sold 1.1 million copies, bringing the total sales of Sticker to 3.58 million copies.

Accolades

Track listing

Credits and personnel 
Credits adapted from liner notes of Sticker and Favorite.

Sticker

Studio 

 SM Booming System – recording, mixing, digital editing , engineered for mix 
 SM LVYIN Studio – recording , mixing , engineered for mix 
 SM Yellow Tail Studio – recording , engineered for mix 
 SM Ssam Studio – recording , digital editing , engineered for mix 
 SM Blue Ocean Studio – mixing 
 SM Blue Cup Studio – mixing 
 SM Big Shot Studio – mixing , engineered for mix 
 SM Concert Hall Studio – mixing 
 SM Starlight Studio – digital editing 
 Sound Pool Studio – recording , digital editing 
 Doobdoob Studio – recording , digital editing 
 Sonic Korea – mastering 
 821 Sound Mastering – mastering

Personnel 

 SM Entertainment – executive producer
 Lee Soo-man – producer
 Lee Sung-soo – production director, executive supervisor
 Tak Young-jun – executive supervisor
 NCT 127 – vocals , background vocals 
 Taeil – background vocals  
 Doyoung – background vocals 
 Jaehyun – background vocals 
 Haechan – background vocals 
 Johnny – background vocals 
 Yoo Young-jin – lyrics, composition, arrangement, vocal directing, background vocals, recording, mixing, digital editing , engineered for mix , music and sound supervisor 
 Han Yeo-reum (Joombas) – lyrics 
 Teuru (Joombas) – lyrics 
 Jeong Ha-ri (Joombas) – lyrics 
 Lee Chang-hyeok – lyrics 
 Jung Yoon-hwa – lyrics 
 Seo Hye-ri – lyrics 
 Sahara (Joombas) – lyrics 
  – lyrics, composition, vocal directing 
 Sokodomo – lyrics, rap vocal director 
 Jo Yoon-kyung – lyrics 
 Ellie Suh (Joombas) – lyrics 
 Le'mon (Joombas) – lyrics 
 San (Vendors) – lyrics 
 Baek Geum-min – lyrics 
 ZNEE (Joombas) – lyrics 
 Rick Bridges – lyrics 
 Prince Chapelle – composition, background vocals 
 Calixte – composition, background vocals 
 Dem Jointz – composition, arrangement 
 Ryan S. Jhun – composition, arrangement 
 Charles "Rokman" Rhodes – composition, arrangement 
 Benji Bae – composition 
 Simon Petrén – composition, arrangement, background vocals 
 Andreas Öberg – composition 
 Ninos Hanna – composition, background vocals 
 Jaicko Lawrence – composition, background vocals 
 Oluwayomi Emmanuel Oredein – composition 
 Darius Michael Bryant – composition 
 Otha "Vaskeen" Davis III – composition 
 Droyd – arrangement 
 Les Alliance – arrangement 
 Softserveboy – composition 
 Sqvare – composition 
 Hwan Yang – composition, arrangement 
 Alexander Karlsson (JeL) – composition, arrangement, background vocals 
 Alexej Viktorovitch (JeL) – composition, arrangement 
 Alex Nese – composition, background vocals 
 Hitchhiker – composition, arrangement, vocal directing 
  – composition 
 John Fulford – composition 
 Harvey Mason Jr. – composition, arrangement 
 Patrick "J. Que" Smith – composition 
 Dewain Whitmore – composition 
 Britt Burton – composition 
  – composition, arrangement 
 MLC – composition 
 Cutfather – composition, arrangement 
 Daniel Davidsen (PhD) – composition, arrangement 
 Peter Wallevik (PhD) – composition, arrangement 
 Boy Matthews – composition, background vocals 
 Asia Whiteacre – composition, background vocals 
 Noah Conrad – composition, background vocals 
 Roland "Rollo" Spreckley – composition 
 Tony Ferrari – composition 
 Ryan Linvill – composition, background vocals 
 GDLO – vocal directing , background vocals , digital editing , Pro Tools operating 
 Seo Mi-rae (ButterFly) – vocal directing , digital editing , Pro Tools operating 
 Lee Joo-myung – vocal directing, Pro Tools operating 
 Choo Dae-gwan – vocal directing, Pro Tools operating 
 Joo Chan-yang – vocal directing, background vocals 
 Lee Ji-hong – recording , mixing , engineered for mix 
 Noh Min-ji – recording , engineered for mix 
 Kang Eun-ji – recording , digital editing , engineered for mix 
 Jung Ho-jin – recording , digital editing 
 Kim Cheol-sun – mixing 
 Jung Eui-seok – mixing 
 Lee Min-gyu – mixing , engineered for mix 
 Nam Koong-jin – mixing 
 Jung Yu-ra – digital editing 
 Eugene Kwon – recording 
 Jung Woo-young – recording , digital editing 
 Kim Ye-ji – recording 
 Kim Ji-hyun – recording 
 Jeon Hoon – mastering 
 Shin Soo-min – mastering assistant 
 Kwon Nam-woo – mastering

Favorite

Studio 

 SM Booming System – recording, mixing, digital editing , engineered for mix 
 SM LVYIN Studio – recording , mixing , engineered for mix 
 SM Yellow Tail Studio – , engineered for mix 
 SM SSAM Studio – recording , digital editing , engineered for mix 
 SM Blue Ocean Studio – mixing 
 SM Blue Cup Studio – mixing 
 SM Big Shot Studio – mixing , engineered for mix 
 SM Concert Hall Studio – mixing 
 SM Starlight Studio – recording , digital editing 
 Sound Pool Studio – recording , digital editing 
 Doobdoob Studio – recording , digital editing 
 Sonic Korea – mastering 
 821 Sound Mastering – mastering

Personnel 

 SM Entertainment – executive producer
 Lee Soo-man – producer
 Lee Sung-soo – production director, executive supervisor
 Tak Young-jun – executive supervisor
 NCT 127 – vocals , background vocals 
 Taeil – background vocals  
 Doyoung – background vocals 
 Jaehyun – background vocals 
 Haechan – background vocals 
 Johnny – background vocals 
 Kenzie – lyrics, composition, arrangement, vocal directing 
 Yoo Young-jin – lyrics, composition, arrangement, vocal directing, background vocals, recording, mixing, digital editing , engineered for mix , music and sound supervisor 
 Ku Tae-woo – lyrics 
 Han Yeo-reum (Joombas) – lyrics 
 Teuru (Joombas) – lyrics 
 Jeong Ha-ri (Joombas) – lyrics 
 Mingtion – lyrics, composition, arrangement, vocal directing, digital editing 
 Junny – lyrics, composition, vocal directing, background vocals 
 Lee Chang-hyeok – lyrics 
 Jung Yoon-hwa – lyrics 
 Seo Hye-ri – lyrics 
 Sahara (Joombas) – lyrics 
  – lyrics, composition, vocal directing 
 sokodomo – lyrics, rap vocal director 
 Jo Yoon-kyung – lyrics 
 Ellie Suh (Joombas) – lyrics 
 Le'mon (Joombas) – lyrics 
 San (Vendors) – lyrics 
 Baek Geum-min – lyrics 
 ZNEE (Joombas) – lyrics 
 Rick Bridges – lyrics 
 Prince Chapelle – composition, background vocals 
 Calixte – composition, background vocals 
 Dem Jointz – composition, arrangement 
 Ryan S. Jhun – composition, arrangement 
 Charles "Rokman" Rhodes – composition, arrangement 
 Benji Bae – composition 
 Simon Petrén – composition, arrangement, background vocals 
 Andreas Öberg – composition 
 Ninos Hanna – composition, background vocals 
 Jaicko Lawrence – composition, background vocals 
 Oluwayomi Emmanuel Oredein – composition 
 Darius Michael Bryant – composition 
 Otha "Vaskeen" Davis III – composition 
 Droyd – arrangement 
 LES Alliance – arrangement 
 Softserveboy – composition 
 Sqvare – composition 
 Hwan Yang – composition, arrangement 
 Alexander Karlsson (JeL) – composition, arrangement, background vocals 
 Alexej Viktorovitch (JeL) – composition, arrangement 
 Alex Nese – composition, background vocals 
 Hitchhiker – composition, arrangement, vocal directing 
  – composition 
 John Fulford – composition 
 Harvey Mason Jr. – composition, arrangement 
 Patrick "J. Que" Smith – composition 
 Dewain Whitmore – composition 
 Britt Burton – composition 
  – composition, arrangement 
 MLC – composition 
 Cutfather – composition, arrangement 
 Daniel Davidsen (PhD) – composition, arrangement 
 Peter Wallevik (PhD) – composition, arrangement 
 Boy Matthews – composition, background vocals 
 Asia Whiteacre – composition, background vocals 
 Noah Conrad – composition, background vocals 
 Roland "Rollo" Spreckley – composition 
 Tony Ferrari – composition 
 Ryan Linvill – composition, background vocals 
 GDLO – vocal directing , background vocals , digital editing , Pro Tools operating 
 Seo Mi-rae (ButterFly) – vocal directing , digital editing , Pro Tools operating , background vocals 
 Lee Joo-myung – vocal directing, Pro Tools operating 
 Choo Dae-gwan – vocal directing, Pro Tools operating 
 Joo Chan-yang – vocal directing, background vocals 
 Oiaisle – background vocals 
 Lee Ji-hong – recording , mixing , engineered for mix 
 Noh Min-ji – recording , engineered for mix 
 Kang Eun-ji – recording , digital editing , engineered for mix 
 Jung Ho-jin – recording , digital editing 
 Kim Cheol-sun – mixing 
 Jung Eui-seok – mixing 
 Lee Min-gyu – mixing , engineered for mix 
 Nam Koong-jin – mixing 
 Jung Yu-ra – recording , digital editing 
 Eugene Kwon – recording 
 Jung Woo-young – recording , digital editing 
 Kim Ye-ji – recording 
 Kim Ji-hyun – recording 
 Lee Kyung-min – recording 
 Jeon Hoon – mastering 
 Shin Soo-min – mastering assistant 
 Kwon Nam-woo – mastering

Charts

Weekly charts

Monthly charts

Year-end charts

Certifications and sales

Release history

Notes

References

	

2021 albums
Korean-language albums
NCT 127 albums
SM Entertainment albums
Universal Music Group albums